Podothecus hamlini is a fish in the family [Agonidae]]. It was described by David Starr Jordan and Charles Henry Gilbert in 1898.

References

hamlini
Fish described in 1898